Richard Stephen Dreyfuss (born Dreyfus; October 29, 1947) is an American actor. He is known for starring in popular films during the 1970s, 1980s, and 1990s, including American Graffiti (1973), Jaws (1975), Close Encounters of the Third Kind (1977), The Goodbye Girl (1977), The Competition (1980), Stand by Me (1986), Down and Out in Beverly Hills (1986), Stakeout (1987), Always (1989), What About Bob? (1991), and Mr. Holland's Opus (1995).

Dreyfuss won the Academy Award for Best Actor in 1977 for The Goodbye Girl (at the time, the youngest-ever actor, at age 30, to win) and was nominated in 1995 for Mr. Holland's Opus. He has also won a Golden Globe Award, a BAFTA Award, and was nominated in 2002 for two Screen Actor's Guild Awards for his portrayal of former Secretary of State Alexander Haig in the Showtime Networks ensemble film The Day Reagan Was Shot.

Early life
Dreyfuss was born on October 29, 1947, in Brooklyn, New York, the second and younger son of Norman Dreyfuss (1920–2013), an attorney, restaurateur and plastics company owner originally from a "violent gang culture in Brooklyn", and Geraldine ( Robbins; 1921–2000), a peace activist. He is the second child of three children. He has an older brother, Lorin Dreyfuss (b. 1944), who is an actor, film producer and screenplay writer, and a younger sister, Cathy. His father Norman suffered from the debilitating physical effects of a mortar explosion at the Battle of the Bulge in World War II, requiring the use of crutches, canes, and special footwear provided by the Army for the rest of his life. He left the family when his son was 21 years old, and remarried more than once; he and his son were not on speaking terms at the time of his death.

Dreyfuss was raised in the Bayside area of Queens, New York. His family is Jewish, descended from immigrants from Russia and Poland. He has commented that he "grew up thinking that Alfred Dreyfus and [he] are from the same family". His father disliked New York, and moved the family first to Europe, and later to Los Angeles, California, when Dreyfuss was nine. Dreyfuss attended Beverly Hills High School.

Career

Dreyfuss began acting in his youth, at Temple Emanuel of Beverly Hills Arts Center and the Westside Jewish Community Center, under drama teacher Bill Miller. He debuted in the TV production In Mama's House, when he was fifteen. He attended San Fernando Valley State College, now California State University, Northridge, for a year, and was a conscientious objector during the Vietnam War, working in alternate service for two years, as a clerk in a Los Angeles hospital. During this time, he acted in a few small TV roles on shows such as Peyton Place, Gidget, That Girl, Gunsmoke, Bewitched, The Ghost & Mrs. Muir, and The Big Valley. During the late 1960s and early 1970s, he also performed on stage on Broadway, Off-Broadway, repertory, and improvisational theater.

Dreyfuss appeared in the play The Time of Your Life, which was revived on March 17, 1972, at the Huntington Hartford Theater in Los Angeles, and directed by Edwin Sherin.

Dreyfuss's first film role was a small, uncredited appearance in The Graduate. He had one line, "Shall I get the cops? I'll get the cops." He was also briefly seen as a stagehand in Valley of the Dolls (1967), in which he had a few lines. In 1973 he starred in the CBS pilot Catch-22. He appeared in the subsequent Dillinger, and landed a role in the 1973 hit American Graffiti, acting with other future stars such as Harrison Ford and Ron Howard. Dreyfuss played his first lead role in the Canadian film The Apprenticeship of Duddy Kravitz (1974), receiving positive reviews, including praise from Pauline Kael.

Dreyfuss went on to star in box office blockbusters Jaws (1975) and Close Encounters of the Third Kind (1977), both directed by Steven Spielberg. He won the 1978 Academy Award for Best Actor at the 50th Academy Awards ceremony for his portrayal of a struggling actor in The Goodbye Girl (1977), becoming the youngest actor to do so (at the age of 30 years, 125 days old), besting Marlon Brando, who had won his first Oscar in 1955 at the age of 30 years, 360 days old. This record stood for 25 years until it was broken in 2003 by Adrien Brody, who was three weeks shy of age 30 at the time of the 75th Academy Awards ceremony. 
Dreyfuss is still, however, the shortest to have ever won Best Actor, standing at about 5 foot 4¼ inches tall.

In just five years, between 1973 and 1978, the films that Dreyfuss appeared in grossed upwards of $900 million.

Around 1978, Dreyfuss began using cocaine frequently; his addiction came to a head four years later in 1982, when he was arrested for possession of the drug after he blacked out while driving, and his Mercedes-Benz 450 SL struck a tree. He entered rehabilitation and eventually made a Hollywood comeback with the films Down And Out In Beverly Hills in 1986 and Stakeout the following year. Dreyfuss had an important cameo in the Rob Reiner movie Stand by Me, a 1986 coming-of-age drama/comedy film adapted from Stephen King's novella The Body. Dreyfuss plays the elder Gordie Lachance (played by his Buddy System co-star Wil Wheaton), who narrates the film. In 1988, he reunited with director Paul Mazursky to star in the political farce Moon Over Parador. In addition, a movie -  Whose Life Is It Anyway? is a 1981 American drama film directed by John Badham and starring Richard Dreyfuss.

In 1989, Dreyfuss reunited with Spielberg on Always, a remake of A Guy Named Joe in which he co-starred with Holly Hunter. He had a starring role opposite Bill Murray in the 1991 comedy What About Bob?, as a psychiatrist driven to insanity by a particularly obsessive new patient. That same year, Dreyfuss produced and starred as Georges Picquart in Prisoner of Honor, an HBO movie about the historical Dreyfus Affair.

In 1994, he participated in the historic Papal Concert to Commemorate the Shoah at the Vatican in the presence of Pope John Paul II, Rav Elio Toaff, chief rabbi of Rome, and Oscar Luigi Scalfaro, President of the Italian Republic. He recited Kaddish as part of a performance of Leonard Bernstein's Third Symphony with the Royal Philharmonic Orchestra under the baton of Gilbert Levine. The event was broadcast worldwide.

Dreyfuss was nominated for an Oscar and a Golden Globe for his performance as Glenn Holland in Mr. Holland's Opus (1995). Since then, he has continued working in movies, television and the stage. In 2001–2002, he played Max Bickford in the television drama The Education of Max Bickford. In April 2004, he appeared in the revival of Sly Fox on Broadway (opposite Eric Stoltz, René Auberjonois, Bronson Pinchot and Elizabeth Berkley).

In 1997, Dreyfuss recorded a voiceover for the Apple Computer "Think Different" ad campaign, and also provided the voice of the narrator in The Call of the Wild: Dog of the Yukon.

In November 2004, he was scheduled to appear in The Producers in London, but withdrew from the production a week before opening night. The media noted that Dreyfuss was still suffering from problems relating to an operation for a herniated disc in January, and that the part of Max Bialystock in the play is a physically demanding one. Both he and his assistant for the production stated that Dreyfuss was accumulating injuries that required him to wear physical therapy supports during rehearsals. After Dreyfuss was officially let go from the production he was replaced by Nathan Lane. He ultimately made his West End debut at The Old Vic in 2009.

In 2006, he appeared as Richard Nelson, a gay architect and one of the survivors in the film Poseidon. Dreyfuss portrayed U.S Vice President Dick Cheney in Oliver Stone's 2008 George W. Bush bio-pic W.

In early 2009, he appeared in the play Complicit by Joe Sutton at London's Old Vic theatre. The production was directed by the theatre's artistic director, Kevin Spacey. Dreyfuss's performance was subject to some controversy, owing to his use of an earpiece onstage, reportedly because of his inability to learn his lines in time. According to an article published in 2017, Kevin Spacey groped one of Dreyfuss's sons while the three of them were alone in Spacey's apartment, an allegation that a lawyer representing Kevin Spacey denied. Richard Dreyfuss was focused on learning the lines of his script at the time and did not notice the harassment occur. He guest-voiced as himself in the "Three Kings" episode of Family Guy in 2009, and later appeared again in the episode "Peter-assment". Dreyfuss guest starred in the sixth season of Weeds as Warren Schiff, Nancy's high school teacher to whom she had lost her virginity.

In 2010 he played Matt Boyd in Piranha 3D.

Dreyfuss was inducted as a "star" on the Hollywood Walk of Fame on October 10, 1996. It is located at 7021 Hollywood Blvd.

Dreyfuss was among 99 other stars at the 2012 Academy Awards – Night of 100 Stars. He did an interview for the Bill Zucker Show with actor/singer Bill Zucker.

In 2014 he appeared with best-selling Abraham Lincoln scholar Ronald C. White in a documentary entitled "Lincoln's Greatest Speech", highlighting Lincoln's Second Inaugural Address, appearing as host of the program and reciting Lincoln's speech on camera.

On February 18, 2015, it was announced that Dreyfuss would portray Bernie Madoff in the miniseries Shots Fired. The first episode was telecast on February 3, 2016, co-starring Blythe Danner.

On September 25, 2017, it was announced that The Last Laugh will be headlined by Richard Dreyfuss, Chevy Chase and Andie MacDowell, and it was released on Netflix on January 11, 2019.

Other work

The Dreyfuss Civics Initiative 

Dreyfuss seeks to revive civics education to teach future generations about the power of their citizenship and the principles that hold America together. In 2006, he created The Dreyfuss Civics Initiative (TDCI). TDCI's mission is to revitalize and enhance the teaching of Civics in American public education to empower future generations with the critical thinking skills needed to fulfill the vast potential of American citizenship. TDCI is a 501(c)3 designated organization, recognized as of 2008.

Dreyfuss has made numerous public appearances since the organization's founding to raise awareness, generate discussion and foster dialogue regarding the need for increased civic education. On February 16, 2006, he spoke at The National Press Club in Washington, D.C., in hopes of prompting a national discussion on impeachment charges against U.S. President George W. Bush. On November 17, 2006, Dreyfuss appeared on HBO's Real Time with Bill Maher as a panel member to discuss teaching Civics in schools. He formerly served on the board of trustees of the National Constitution Center in Philadelphia. In 2007, Dreyfuss appeared in the youth voting documentary film 18 in '08. In 2014, Dreyfuss appeared on Huckabee, hosted by former Arkansas Governor Mike Huckabee, to discuss how civic education can create a stronger America and to ask viewers to sign the Preamble to support the cause.

Dreyfuss was also an advisor to The Mr. Holland's Opus Foundation.

Politics
Dreyfuss has been outspoken regarding the media's influence in shaping public opinion, policy, and legislation. In the 2000s, he expressed his sentiments in favor of right to privacy, freedom of speech, democracy, and individual accountability. In 2011 and 2014, Dreyfuss was elected to the Common Cause National Governing Board.

Books and articles
In 1995, Dreyfuss co-authored with science-fiction writer Harry Turtledove the book The Two Georges, a steampunk/alternate history/mystery novel set in the year 1995 of a timeline in which the American Revolution was peacefully avoided. Thomas Gainsborough's painting of George Washington and King George III, which symbolizes English-speaking North Americans' loyalty to the British Empire, is stolen by anti-Imperial terrorists known as the Sons of Liberty, and officers of the Royal American Mounted Police must find it before it is destroyed.

In 2015, Dreyfuss, Russ Porter, Kellie Cude, and Stephen Anderson published an article on "The Dreyfuss Civics Curriculum: A National Model for Civics Education in Elementary and Secondary Schools". As a result of the article, hundreds of teachers have returned civics education to the classroom using the Dreyfuss Civics Curriculum and are continuing the discussion for a new generation of U.S. citizens on how to improve Civics education.

Personal life

Dreyfuss married writer and producer Jeramie Rain in the early 1980s, and they had three children: Emily (born 1983), Benjamin (born 1986), and Harry (born 1990). His elder son, Benjamin, was born with Peters Anomaly, a rare genetic eye disorder which, despite many operations, left him blind in his left eye. Dreyfuss and Rain have continued to raise money for ophthalmology centers throughout the United States. After his 1995 divorce from Rain, Dreyfuss married Janelle Lacey in 1999, but they divorced in 2005.

In 2006, Dreyfuss discussed his diagnosis of bipolar disorder in the documentary Stephen Fry: The Secret Life of the Manic Depressive, in which Fry (who also has the disorder) interviewed Dreyfuss about his experience being bipolar.

Dreyfuss and Russian-born Svetlana Erokhin married in 2006 and as of February 2020 they live in San Diego, California, although they have frequently visited New York City, London, and Sun Valley, Idaho, where Dreyfuss once lived. They also lived in Carlsbad, California. In February 2008, they bought a $1.5 million house in Encinitas, California, intending to renovate the 1970s structure with green technologies. 

During his acting career, Dreyfuss had feuds with some of the people he worked with, most notably actors Robert Shaw and Bill Murray, who costarred with him in Jaws and What About Bob? respectively, and filmmaker Oliver Stone, who directed him in W.

Allegation of sexual harassment
In 2017, writer Jessica Teich accused Dreyfuss of sexual harassment during the filming of an ABC special. Dreyfuss denied the allegations. He said he had been overly flirtatious in his past, and that he regretted that behavior, but he emphasized that he "value[s] and respect[s] women" and is "not an assaulter".

Filmography

Awards and nominations

References

External links

THR: Richard Dreyfuss finds 'Happiness' 
The Dreyfuss Initiative
 Richard Dreyfuss interview on BBC Radio 4 Desert Island Discs, May 14, 1999
 

1947 births
Living people
20th-century American comedians
20th-century American male actors
21st-century American comedians
21st-century American male actors
American conscientious objectors
American Freemasons
American male comedians
American male film actors
American male television actors
American Ashkenazi Jews
Best Actor Academy Award winners
Best Actor BAFTA Award winners
Best Musical or Comedy Actor Golden Globe (film) winners
Beverly Hills High School alumni
Comedians from California
David di Donatello winners
Jewish agnostics
Jewish American male actors
Jewish American male comedians
Jewish pacifists
Male actors from Los Angeles
Male actors from New York City
People from Bayside, Queens
People from Brooklyn
People with bipolar disorder
People from Sun Valley, Idaho